The Bull of Osuna is a limestone high relief Iberian sculpture, 82 cm high, dated from the end of the 5th century BCE, that is on display at the National Archaeological Museum of Spain in Madrid.
It was found in the archeological site of the ancient Iberian city of Urso (Osuna) in Seville, Spain. The bull is ashlar and was carved, (probably in a Turdetani workshop), as a funeral monument. It is believed to have had some protective function.

References

Ayuntamiento de Osuna

Limestone statues
Iberian art
Collection of the National Archaeological Museum, Madrid
Sculptures in Madrid
Archaeological discoveries in Spain
Sculptures of bovines